Mohamad Izwan bin Mahbud (born 14 July 1990) is a Singaporean professional footballer who plays as a goalkeeper for Singapore Premier League club Lion City Sailors and the Singapore national team. He was the third-choice goalkeeper of Singapore at the 2010 AFF Championship and broke into the first team as Singapore won the 2012 AFF Championship.

Club career

Young Lions
Izwan began his club career with S.League club Young Lions.

LionsXII
Izwan played for the LionsXll in the Malaysia Super League.

During his time at the LionsXII, Izwan's performance at the 0–0 draw between Singapore and Japan drew interest from several clubs, including newly promoted J-League side Matsumoto Yamaga F.C.  Yamaga's Vice-president Yoshiyuki Kato stated that he was very impressed by Izwan's concentration and ability and gave Izwan a one-week trial at Yamaga. It was later revealed that uncertainty over his ability and the language barrier prevented Izwan from becoming the first Singaporean to play in the J.League, with the club expressing concerns that Izwan was not any better than the local players Yamaga had.

During his time with the LionsXII, Izwan helped the team win the 2013 Malaysian Super League and 2015 Malaysian FA Cup titles.

Tampines Rovers
In late 2015, when the decision was made by the Football Association of Malaysia to kick the LionsXII out of the Malaysian Super League, Izwan, along with former teammates Christopher van Huizen, Izzdin Shafiq, Hafiz Sujad and Firdaus Kasman linked up with former coach V. Sundramoorthy at Tampines Rovers.

Nongbua Pitchaya 
After spending two years with the Stags, Izwan signed for Nongbua Pitchaya, becoming the second Singaporean to play in the Thai League 2, alongside compatriot and fellow goalkeeper, Hassan Sunny, who joined Army United for a second stint. It was reported that Izwan took a pay cut to join the Thai side, underlining his fierce desire to try his talent overseas. His move to Thailand was a successful one as he was named in FourFourTwo's Thai League 2 Team of the Season at the end of the 2018 season.

Trat FC 
After spending two seasons in the Thai League 2, Izwan signed for top-flight Thailand side Trat F.C. for the 2020 Thai League 1 season.

Hougang United 
On 27 June 2021, Izwan return to his home country after a long stint in Thailand by signing for the Singapore Premier League side Hougang United for the remainder of the 2021 season.

Izwan's Hougang debut didn't go as planned as the Cheetahs lost 4–1 to Tanjong Pagar United. Izwan couldn't preserve a point for his side against Albirex at home after conceding a lobbed goal by Takahiro Tezuka and ultimately lost to the title holders.

Izwan picked up his first clean sheet for the Cheetahs in a 1–0 win against Young Lions

International career

Izwan made his international debut for Singapore in a friendly match against Chinese Taipei on 18 July 2011. 
He rose to prominence in 2011 when he started in goal for Singapore as they defeated traditional rivals Malaysia over a two-leg World Cup qualifier in the same month.

On 16 June 2015, Izwan made 18 saves as Singapore managed to hold 4-time Asian Cup winners Japan to a 0–0 draw in Saitama, Japan during a 2018 World Cup and Asian Cup Qualifier match.

Career statistics

Club
. Caps and goals may not be correct.

 Young Lions and LionsXII are ineligible for qualification to AFC competitions in their respective leagues.
 Young Lions withdrew from the Singapore Cup and Singapore League Cup in 2011 due to scheduled participation in the 2011 AFF U-23 Youth Championship.

International

Honours

Club
LionsXII
 Malaysia Super League: 2013
 FA Cup Malaysia: 2015

International
Singapore
 AFF Championship: 2012
Southeast Asian Games: bronze medal – 2013

Individual
2015 Malaysia FA Cup Final: Man Of the Match
2018 FIFA World Cup qualification (AFC); vs Japan, (Saitama Stadium 2002, Saitama): Man Of the Match

References

External links 
 Lions XII profile 
 Goal profile
 
 

1990 births
Living people
People from Singapore
Singaporean footballers
Singapore international footballers
Association football goalkeepers
Singaporean expatriate footballers
Singaporean expatriate sportspeople in Malaysia
Expatriate footballers in Malaysia
Expatriate footballers in Thailand
LionsXII players
Singapore Premier League players
Malaysia Super League players
Young Lions FC players
Nongbua Pitchaya F.C. players
Thai League 2 players
Footballers at the 2010 Asian Games
Singaporean people of Malay descent
Southeast Asian Games bronze medalists for Singapore
Southeast Asian Games medalists in football
Competitors at the 2013 Southeast Asian Games
Asian Games competitors for Singapore